Waltraud Kaser (born 3 July 1980) is an Italian ice hockey player, currently playing for HC Toblach Icebears of the Italian Hockey League Women. She competed in the women's tournament at the 2006 Winter Olympics.

References

1980 births
Living people
Italian women's ice hockey players
Olympic ice hockey players of Italy
Ice hockey players at the 2006 Winter Olympics
Sportspeople from Brixen
European Women's Hockey League players